R. africana may refer to:
 Rhinochimaera africana, the paddlenose chimaera or paddlenose spookfish, a fish species
 Richardia africana, a synonym for Zantedeschia aethiopica, the lily of the Nile, Calla lily, Easter lily or arum lily, a plant species

See also
 Africana (disambiguation)